Jürgen Melzer and Philipp Petzschner were the defending champions, but Melzer decided not to participate this year.
Petzschner played with Michael Kohlmann, but they lost to Lukáš Dlouhý and Radek Štěpánek already in the first round.
Dick Norman and Horia Tecău won this tournament, by defeating Marcel Granollers and Marc López 6–3, 6–4 in the final match.

Seeds

  Marcel Granollers /  Marc López (final)
  Dick Norman /  Horia Tecău (champions)
  Simon Aspelin /  Julian Knowle (semifinals)
  Philipp Petzschner /  Michael Kohlmann (first round)

Draw

Draw

External links
 Main Draw

PBZ Zagreb Indoors - Doubles
2011 Doubles
2011 PBZ Zagreb Indoors